Scymnus ater, is a species of beetle found in the family Coccinellidae. It is found in Central and Eastern Europe.

References 

Coccinellidae
Beetles described in 1794